"I'll Take the Dog" is a single by American country music artists Ray Pillow and Jean Shepard.  Released in April 1966, it was the first single and title track from their album I'll Take the Dog.  The song reached #9 on the Billboard Hot Country Singles chart.

Chart performance

References 

1966 singles
Jean Shepard songs
Ray Pillow songs
Capitol Records singles
1966 songs